Elizabeth L. Jockusch is an American evolutionary biologist who studies plethodontidae salamanders and other organisms. While working with David Wake and others, she has identified multiple new species of Batrachoseps salamanders. She works as a professor and lab director of the Jockusch Lab in the Department of Ecology and Evolutionary Biology at the University of Connecticut.

In 2014, she was elected to the council of the Society of Systematic Biologists for a three-year term.

Selected publications 

 Elizabeth L. Jockusch. (1997). An Evolutionary Correlate of Genome Size Change in Plethodontid Salamanders. Proceedings: Biological Sciences, 264(1381), 597–604.
Jockusch, E.L. and Wake, D.B. 2002. Falling apart and merging: diversification of slender salamanders (Plethodontidae: Batrachoseps) in the American West. Biological Journal of the Linnean Society, 76: 361–391. https://doi.org/10.1046/j.1095-8312.2002.00071.x 
 Galis F, Wagner GP, Jockusch EL. Why is limb regeneration possible in amphibians but not in reptiles, birds, and mammals? Evolution & Development. 2003;5(2):208-220. doi:10.1046/j.1525-142X.2003.03028.x 
Evans, A. E., Urban, M. C., & Jockusch, E. L. (2020). Developmental temperature influences color polymorphism but not hatchling size in a woodland salamander. Oecologia, 192(4), 909. https://doi.org/10.1007/s00442-020-04630-y 
 Jockusch EL, Hansen RW, Fisher RN, Wake DB. 2020. Slender salamanders (genus Batrachoseps) reveal Southern California to be a center for the diversification, persistence, and introduction of salamander lineages. PeerJ 8:e9599 https://doi.org/10.7717/peerj.9599 
 Jockusch, Elizabeth L, Fisher, Cera R. August 2021. Something old, something new, something borrowed, something red: the origin of ecologically relevant novelties in Hemiptera. Current Opinion in Genetics & Development, 69. https://doi.org/10.1016/j.gde.2021.04.003 
Samuel S. Sweet, Elizabeth L. Jockusch "A New Relict Species of Slender Salamander (Plethodontidae: Batrachoseps) with a Tiny Range from Point Arguello, California," Ichthyology & Herpetology, 109(3), 836–850, (23 September 2021)

References 

Living people
American herpetologists
University of Connecticut faculty
American women biologists
Year of birth missing (living people)
Place of birth missing (living people)
Evolutionary biologists
Women herpetologists
Women evolutionary biologists